was a  after Tenpyō-kanpō and before Tenpyō-hōji. This period spanned the years from July 749 through August 757.

Change of era
 749 : The new era name of Tenpyō-shōhō (meaning "Heavenly Peace and Victorious Treasure") was created to mark the accession of Empress Kōken.  Shortly after Tenpyō-kanpō was initially proclaimed, Shōmu renounced the throne, thus becoming the first emperor to take the tonsure as a Buddhist monk.  Shōmu's reign and the Tenpyō-kanpō era ended simultaneously as he began a new phase of his life.  The previous era ended after a mere four months,  and the new one commenced in Tenpyō-kanpō 1, on the 2nd day of the 7th month of 749.

Events of the Tenpyō-shōhō era
 749 (Tenpyō-shōhō 1): Emperor Shōmu abdicates, and his daughter receives the succession (senso).  Shortly thereafter, Empress Kōken formally accedes to the throne (sokui).
 749 (Tenpyō-shōhō 1)
 752 (Tenpyō-shōhō 4, 4th month): The Eye-Opening Ceremony celebrating the completion of the Great Buddha is held at Tōdai-ji in Nara.
 5 September 750 (Tenpyō-shōhō 2, 1st day of the 8th month): In the 10th year of Kōken-tennōs reign (称徳天皇10年), the empress abdicated; and succession (senso) was received by her adopted son.  Shortly thereafter, Emperor Junnin is said to have acceded to the throne (sokui).

Notes

References
 Bowman, John Stewart. (2000). Columbia Chronologies of Asian History and Culture. New York: Columbia University Press. ; ;  OCLC 42429361
 Brown, Delmer M. and Ichirō Ishida, eds. (1979).  Gukanshō: The Future and the Past. Berkeley: University of California Press. ;  OCLC 251325323
 Nussbaum, Louis-Frédéric and Käthe Roth. (2005).  Japan encyclopedia. Cambridge: Harvard University Press. ;  OCLC 58053128
 Titsingh, Isaac. (1834). Nihon Odai Ichiran; ou,  Annales des empereurs du Japon.  Paris: Royal Asiatic Society, Oriental Translation Fund of Great Britain and Ireland. OCLC 5850691
 Varley, H. Paul. (1980). A Chronicle of Gods and Sovereigns: Jinnō Shōtōki of Kitabatake Chikafusa. New York: Columbia University Press.  ;  OCLC 6042764

External links
 National Diet Library, "The Japanese Calendar" -- historical overview plus illustrative images from library's collection

Japanese eras
8th century in Japan
749 beginnings
757 endings